Adam Gaži (born 1 March 2003) is a Slovak footballer who plays for Tatran Liptovský Mikuláš in the Fortuna Liga as a winger, on loan from AS Trenčín.

Club career

AS Trenčín
Gaži made his Fortuna Liga debut for AS Trenčín against ŠK Slovan Bratislava on 14 February 2021.

References

External links
 AS Trenčín official club profile
 Futbalnet profile
 

2003 births
Living people
People from Dubnica nad Váhom
Sportspeople from the Trenčín Region
Slovak footballers
Slovakia youth international footballers
Association football forwards
AS Trenčín players
FK Dubnica players
MFK Tatran Liptovský Mikuláš players
Slovak Super Liga players
2. Liga (Slovakia) players